I, Eye, Aye is a live album by jazz multi-instrumentalist Rahsaan Roland Kirk featuring performances by Kirk recorded at the Montreux Jazz Festival in 1972 with Ron Burton, Henry "Pete" Pearson, Robert Shy and Joe Habao Texidor first released on the Rhino label in 1996 on CD and on VHS under the title "The One Man Twins."

The Allmusic review by Thom Jurek states "The set is absolutely electrifying. From the few short raps Kirk offers the crowd, one cannot be prepared for the honking, shouting, funky, gritty sets that follow... This is a hell of an introduction to one of the least-understood figures in jazz history, and an absolute necessity for fans".

Track listing
All compositions by Rahsaan Roland Kirk except as indicated.
  "Rahsaantalk, No. 1" - 0:38
 "Seasons" - 6:00
 "Rahsaantalk, No. 2" - 1:12
 "Balm in Gilead" (Traditional) - 7:05
 "Volunteered Slavery" - 10:20
 "Rahsaantalk, No. 3" - 0:24
 "Blue Rol, No. 2" - 9:04
 "Solo Piece: Satin Doll/Improvisation" (Duke Ellington/Kirk) - 4:19
 "Serenade to a Cuckoo" - 3:28
 "Pedal Up" - 6:11
Recorded at the Montreux Jazz Festival, Switzerland on June 24, 1972

Personnel
Roland Kirk: tenor saxophone, manzello, stritch, clarinet, flute
Ron Burton: piano
Henry "Pete" Pearson: bass
Robert Shy: drums
Joe Habao Texidor: percussion

References

Rahsaan Roland Kirk live albums
1996 live albums
Rhino Records live albums